Shinsuke Numata (born 1978) is a Japanese writer.

He was born in Otaru. He was awarded 157th Akutagawa Prize in 2017, for Eiri (影裏).

References

1978 births
Living people
Japanese writers
Akutagawa Prize winners
People from Otaru
Writers from Hokkaido